Benito "Veleno" Lorenzi (20 December 1925 – 3 March 2007) was an Italian footballer born in Borgo a Buggiano, province of Pistoia. He played as a striker.

Club career
Throughout his career (1947–1960), Lorenzi played with Italian clubs Inter and Alessandria in Serie A, Empoli and Brescia in Serie B, and Varese in Serie C. He won two back to back Italian league titles (in 1953 and 1954) with Inter, and scored 143 goals in 314 games in official matches.

International career
With the Italian team, Lorenzi scored 4 goals in 14 appearances between 1949 and 1954. He participated in the 1950 and 1954 FIFA World Cups with Italy.

Death
Lorenzi died on 3 March 2007 at Sacco Hospital, Milan; he was 81 years old.

Honours
Inter
Serie A: 1952–53, 1953–54

References

External links
Inter.it

1925 births
2007 deaths
Sportspeople from the Province of Pistoia
Italian footballers
Italy international footballers
Association football forwards
Serie A players
Serie B players
Empoli F.C. players
Inter Milan players
U.S. Alessandria Calcio 1912 players
Brescia Calcio players
S.S.D. Varese Calcio players
1950 FIFA World Cup players
1954 FIFA World Cup players
Italy B international footballers
Footballers from Tuscany